Adam Joachim Vetulani (20 March 1901 – 25 September 1976) was a Polish historian of medieval and canon law, professor of the Jagiellonian University and a General Secretary of the Polish Academy of Learning (1957–58).

Biography 
He was the son of Polish high school professor, Roman Vetulani, and Elżbieta Kunachowicz, brother of Kazimierz, Tadeusz, Zygmunt, Maria, and Elżbieta. He attended high schools in Sanok and Cieszyn, in 1917 he passed examination of maturity in Vienna.

In 1919 he began studying law at Jagiellonian University. After taking part in Polish–Soviet War in 1920 (for which he was decorated with Cross of Valor) Vetulani returned to the university and received master's degree in 1923. One of his professors, Stanisław Kutrzeba, had a strong influence on Vetulani's work. Vetulani received his Ph.D., also with Kutrzeba help, in 1925.

In scientific work Vetulani was best known for his research on Decretum Gratiani. He was a teacher and mentor of Karol Wojtyła, who later became pope John Paul II.

In 1927 he married Irena Latinik, they had two sons: Jerzy (1936–2017) and Jan (1938–1965). Adam had also one love-child, daughter Krystyna (1924–2004).

He was decorated with Croix de Guerre (for World War II) and twice with Polish Cross of Valor (for Polish–Soviet War and World War II). He was an honorary doctor of University of Strasbourg, University of Nancy and University of Pécs.

Family tree

Selected works 
 Lenno pruskie (1930)
 Polskie wpływy polityczne w Prusach Książęcych (1939)
 Dekret Gracjana w świetle najnowszych badań (1948)
 Dzieje historii prawa w Polsce (1948)
 Poza płomieniami wojny. Internowani w Szwajcarii 1940–45 (1976, memoirs)
 Z badań nad kulturą prawniczą w Polsce piastowskiej (1976)

References 

20th-century Polish historians
Polish male non-fiction writers
Members of the Polish Academy of Learning
1901 births
1976 deaths
People from Sanok
Jagiellonian University alumni
Academic staff of Jagiellonian University
Polish people of the Polish–Soviet War
Recipients of the Cross of Valour (Poland)
Recipients of the Croix de Guerre 1939–1945 (France)
Burials at Rakowicki Cemetery
Polish people of Italian descent
Collaborators of the Polish Biographical Dictionary